In Leninist theory, liquidationism is the ideological abandonment (liquidation) of the vanguard party's program, either in whole or in part, by party members.

Concept
According to the Bolshevik leader  Vladimir Lenin, writing in 1909, liquidationism "consists ideologically in negation of the revolutionary class struggle of the socialist proletariat in general, and denial of the hegemony of the proletariat".

Nikolai Aleksandrovich Rozhkov was identified by Lenin as a liquidationist.

In his concluding remarks to the 1914 Marxism and Liquidationism symposium, Lenin made the distinction between "Left liquidationism," which is "leaning towards anarchism, and "Right liquidationism," which is "liquidationism proper" and "leans towards liberalism."

Current use
The term is still used in modern, ideological discussions of the communist left.

See also
Vanguardism
Reformism
Bolshevism
Menshevism
Factions of the Russian Social Democratic Labour Party, which later split into Bolsheviks and Mensheviks

References

Communist terminology
Political theories
Political parties